The Kumasi Zoo (Kumasi Zoological Garden) is a zoo located in the heart of Kumasi in the Ashanti Region of Ghana. The zoo occupies a  area between the Kejetia Bus Terminal, the old race course and the Kumasi Centre for National Culture.

History
The zoo was established in 1951 and officially opened in 1957 by the Asanteman Council to conserve nature and display indigenous wild animals of Ghana.

Animal species

It has about 40 different species of animals, with individual animals numbering over 135. A notable feature is the thousands of bats that rest on trees in the zoo.

References

Buildings and structures in Kumasi
Zoos in Ghana
Zoos established in 1951
Articles needing infobox zoo